Anna Bonaiuto (born 28 January 1950) is an Italian actress. She has appeared in 48 films and television shows since 1973. She starred in L'amore molesto, which was entered into the 1995 Cannes Film Festival.

Selected filmography

References

External links

1950 births
Living people
Italian film actresses
People from Latisana
Accademia Nazionale di Arte Drammatica Silvio D'Amico alumni
David di Donatello winners
Nastro d'Argento winners
Volpi Cup for Best Actress winners
20th-century Italian actresses
21st-century Italian actresses